USS SC-4, during her service life known as Submarine Chaser No. 4 or S.C. 4, was an SC-1-class submarine chaser built for the United States Navy during World War I.

SC-4 was a wooden-hulled 110-foot (34 m) submarine chaser built at Naval Station New Orleans in New Orleans, Louisiana. She was commissioned on 19 February 1918 as USS Submarine Chaser No. 4, abbreviated at the time as USS S.C. 4.

During World War I, S.C. 4 served in the Special Hunting Squadron,  Group, on antisubmarine patrol duty against German submarines in the Gulf of Mexico, and was based at Key West, Florida.

On 19 March 1920, the Navy sold S.C. 4 to David A. Clarkson of Nassau in the Bahamas.

The U.S. Navy adopted its modern hull number system on 17 July 1920. Although Submarine Chaser No. 4 had already been sold by then, since that date she has been referred to retrospectively as USS SC-4 - the shortened name she would have received under the new system had she still been in Navy service at that time.

References 
 
 NavSource Online: Submarine Chaser Photo Archive: SC-4
 The Subchaser Archives: The History of U.S. Submarine Chasers in the Great War Hull number: SC-4
 Woofenden, Todd A. Hunters of the Steel Sharks: The Submarine Chasers of World War I. Bowdoinham, Maine: Signal Light Books, 2006. .

SC-1-class submarine chasers
World War I patrol vessels of the United States
Ships built in New Orleans
1918 ships